The Investiture of the Gods is a 1990 Chinese shenmo television series written by Bing Tian, Gu Hanchang, Ouyang Yuping and Yu Youchen. The television series are based on the classical 16th-century novel Fengshen Yanyi (also known as Investiture of the Gods or Creation of the Gods) written by Xu Zhonglin and Lu Xixing.

Cast 
 Da Qi as King Zhou of Shang
 Lan Tianye as Jiang Ziya
 Fu Yiwei as Daji
 Lei Changxi as Shen Gongbao
 Zhang Xiaolin as King Wu of Zhou
 Wei Qiming as King Wen of Zhou
 Tong Chun Chung as Bo Yikao
 Xu Ya as Queen Shang
 He Wei as Nezha
 Li Jianhua as Erlang Shen
 Ji Zhenhua as Bigan
 Qiao Qi as Shang Rong
 Shi Zhengquan as Wen Zhong
 Zhang Fei as Jizi
 Rebecca Chan as Nüwa
 Li Weizeng as Weizi
 Lu Ling as Queen Jiang
 Sun Jihong as Pipa Jing
 Xia Shasha as Hu Ximei
 Yao Peihua as Concubine Yang
 Zhou Xianli as Concubine Huang
 Zhou Guosheng as Yin Jiao
 Fu Chong as Yin Hong
 Duan Shiping as Dou Fengzhen
 Deng Liguo as Zhang Guifang
 Zhang Yingxiang as Jiang Huanchu
 Ding Qi as Jiang Wenhuan
 Shen Guangwei as Chong Houhu
 Yao Mingde as Chong Heihu
 Li Xinlong as E Chongyu
 Wang Zhengwei as Huang Feihu
 Xu Yong as Huang Tianhua
 Liu Anji as Li Jing
 Yu Huadong as Tu Xingsun
 Jin Ming as Deng Chanyu
 Yao Mingrong as Deng Jiugong
 Li Changnian as Su Hu
 Wang Jinxiang as Zhang Kui
 Cai Jinping as Gao Lanying
 Wei Min as Chao Tian
 Tan Jiabin as Chao Lei
 Yu Jian'guo as Huang Ming
 Chen Yingming as Huang Gun
 Guo Hai as Huang Tianxiang
 Zhu Weizhong as Leizhenzi
 Wang Haidi as Jinzha
 Zhou Ming as Muzha
 Wu Huibiao as Wu Ji
 Li Xinlong as San Yisheng
 Wang Ruoli as Tai Si
 Liu Changwei as Ji Xian
 Weng Guojun as Ji Sui
 Yuan Zhiyuan as Old Man of the South Pole
 Fang Yang as Yuding Zhenren
 Zhang Hongxin as Taiyi Zhenren
 Sun Jixiang as Daode Zhenjun
 Deng Liguo as Guangchengzi
 Yang Zhaoshu as Juliusun
 Chun Guang as Wenshu Guangfa Tianzun
 Lu Ye as Yunzhongzi
 Gu Yan as Huoling Shengwu
 Huang Weiliang as Zhao Gongming
 Qu Ailing as Yunxiao
 Xu Jinli as Bixiao
 Sun Li as Qiongxiao
 Qin Zhen as Duobao Daoren
 Yu Minzhen as Ma Zhaodi (Jiang Ziya's wife)

References

1990 Chinese television series debuts
Television shows based on Investiture of the Gods